World Out of Mind is also the title of a science fiction novel by J. T. McIntosh

World Out of Mind is a Man or Astro-man? 7" EP released on Estrus Records in 1995. It was released exclusively on clear yellow-orange vinyl. Art Chantry designed/illustrated the cover. The cover is die-cut, with a rounded top and 3 lightning bolts cut out.

Track listing

C Side
"Escape Velocity"
"Tomorrow Plus X"

D Side
"Max Q"
"The Quatermass Phenomenon"

References

 

Man or Astro-man? EPs
1995 EPs